The boys' hockey 5s event at the 2018 African Youth Games in Algiers was held at the Stade Ferhani from 19 to 26 July 2018. The tournament served as a direct qualifier for the 2018 Summer Youth Olympics, with the winner and runner-up qualifying.

Qualified teams
 
 
 
 
 
 
 
 
Uganda was supposed to play in Pool B, but withdrew due to a lack of funds.

Format
The eight teams will be split into two groups of four teams. All teams move on to the quarterfinals, and depending on their positions within the pool, they will be playing against a team from the other pool. In the quarterfinals, the four losing teams will be playing for the 5th to 8th place classification, whilst the four winning teams will move on to the semi-finals to determine the winner in a knock-out system.

Preliminary round
''All times are local (UTC+1).

Pool A

Pool B

Knockout stage

Bracket

Quarterfinals

5–7th place semifinal

Fifth place game

Semifinals

Third place game

Final

Final standings

Goalscorers

References

Field hockey at the 2018 Summer Youth Olympics
2018 African Youth Games